Fairy tales are stories that range from those originating in folklore to more modern stories defined as literary fairy tales.

This is a list of Romanian fairy tales:

A
"Aleodor împărat" ("Emperor Aleodor"), by Petre Ispirescu

B
"Băiatul care vorbea cu florile", by Petre Crăciun
"Balaurul cel cu șapte capete"
"Broasca țestoasă cea fermecată"  ("The Enchanted Turtle")
"Băiatul cel bubos și ghigorțul"

C
"Cămașa fermecată", by Petre Crăciun
"Călătorie în spicul de grâu", by Petre Crăciun
"Capra cu trei iezi", by  Ion Creangă"
"Cei trei frați împărați"
"Cele douăsprezece fete de împărat și palatul cel fermecat"
"Cele trei rodii aurite , by Petre Ispirescu"
"Ciobănașul cel isteț sau țurloaiele blendei"
"Copiii văduvului și iepurele, vulpea, lupul și ursul"
"Cotoșman năzdrăvanu"

D
"Departe, departe"
"Dochia" (Dimitrie Bolintineanu)
"Doi feți cu stea în frunte" ("The Boys with the Golden Stars"), by Ioan Slavici
"Două oale", by Petre Crăciun
"Dănilă Prepeleac" de Ion Creangă
"Drumul curcubeului", by Petre Crăciun

F
"Fata babei și fata moșneagului" by Ion Creangă
"Fata cu pieze rele"
"Fata cea frumoasă și fântâna cu apă tulbure", by Petre Crăciun
"Fata cea urâtă și omul cel nătâng", by Petre Crăciun
"Fata de împărat și fiul văduvei"
 "Fata din dafin" ("The Bay-Tree Maiden")
"Fata moșului cea cu minte"
"Fata săracului cea isteață"
"Florița din codru"
"Făt-Frumos" (Bolintineanu)
"Făt-Frumos cel rătăcit"
"Făt-Frumos cu carâta de sticlă"
"Făt-Frumos cu părul de aur" ("Făt-Frumos with the Golden Hair" or "The Foundling Prince") by Petre Ispirescu
"Făt-Frumos din lacrimă" by Mihai Eminescu
"Făt-Frumos cu Moț-în-Frunte"
"Floarea înțelepciunii și Iarba puterii", by Petre Crăciun

G
"George cel viteaz"
"Greuceanu"
"Găinăreasa"
"Grădina ascunsă", by Petre Crăciun

H
"Hoțu împărat"
"Povestea lui Harap Alb" by Ion Creangă

I

"Ileana Simziana (or "Ileana Cosânzeana"), by Petre Ispirescu
"Ileana cea șireată" ("Cunning Ileane"), by Ioan Slavici
"Ivan Turbincă" ("The Story of Ivan Turbincă"), by Ion Creangă

Î
"Împăratul cel Bătrân și mărul cu poame fermecate", by Petre Crăciun
"Împărăția femeilor leneșe", by Petre Crăciun
"Înșir-te mărgărite" ("A String of Pearls Twined with Golden Flowers")
"Împărat în Țară străină", by Petre Crăciun

L
"Luceafărul de ziuă și luceafărul de noapte"
"Lupul cel năzdrăvan și Făt-Frumos"

M

"Mihnea și baba"

N
"Neghiniță"
"Norocul dracului"
"Numai cu vitele se scoate sărăcia din casă"

O
"O noapte la morminte"
"Omul de piatră" ("The Man of Stone")
"Omul de flori cu barba de mătasă" 
"Omul care schimba anotimpurile", by Petre Crăciun
"Omul-Ceață, prietenul Măriei Sale", by Petre Crăciun

P
"Palatul de cleștar"
"Pasărea măiastră" ("The Wonderful Bird") by Petre Ispirescu
"Petre pescarul", by Petre Crăciun
"Porcul cel fermecat"  ("The Enchanted Pig")
"Poveste" (Delavrancea)
"Poveste țărănească"
"Povestea lui Harap-Alb" by Ion Creangă
"Povestea lui Stan Pățitul" by Ion Creangă
"Povestea porcului" by Ion Creangă
"Povestea balaurului beteag", by Petre Crăciun
"Prâslea cel voinic și merele de aur" ("Prâslea the Brave and the Golden Apples")
"Punguța cu doi bani" by Ion Creangă

R
"Rodul tainic"
"Roman Năzdrăvan"

S
"Soacra cu trei nurori" by Ion Creangă
"Spaima zmeilor"
"Sarea în bucate"
"Spancioc, spaima zmeilor"

T
"Tinerețe fără bătrânețe și viață fără de moarte" ("Youth Without Aging and Life Without Death")
"Trandafiru", by Arthur Carl Victor Schott and Albert Schott

Ț
"Țugulea, fiul unchiașului și al mătușei"
"Țara Adevărului și Împăratul Minciună", by Petre Crăciun
"Țara unde oamenii nu visau niciodată", by Petre Crăciun
"Țara scriitorilor de noroc", by Petre Crăciun

V
"Voinicel și Vrăjitoarea cea Albă", by Petre Crăciun
"Voinicul cel cu cartea în mână născut"
"Voinicul cel fără de tată"

Z
"Zina-Doamna"
 "Zâna Zorilor" (The Fairy Aurora)
"Zâna munților"
"Zâna zânelor"

References

 Ioan Slavici, Limir-împărat, Editura Ion Creangă, Biblioteca școlarului, 1986 
 Petre Ispirescu, Legende sau basmele românilor ("Legends or Romanian Fairy-tales")
 I.C.Fundescu - Basme, orații, păcălituri și ghicitori, ed. a III-a. București, 1875, p. 61— 76.
Șăineanu, Lazăr – Basmele române, Ed. Minerva, București, 1978;
Vulcănescu, Romulus – Mitologie română, Ed. Academiei, București, 1997.

See also
 List of fairy tales